Heinrich Limpricht  (21 April 1827 – 13 May 1909) was a German chemist. Limpricht was a pupil of Friedrich Wöhler; he worked on the chemistry of furans and pyrroles, discovering furan in 1870.

In 1852 he became lecturer and in 1855 extraordinary professor at the University of Göttingen. In 1860, he became ordinary professor at the Institute for Organic Chemistry at the University of Greifswald. His oldest daughter Marie (1856-1925) married in 1875 to Protestant theologian Julius Wellhausen.

Rudolph Fittig and Hans von Pechmann were two of Limpricht's notable pupils.

References 

   
 Gerda Schneider: Heinrich Limpricht und sein Schülerkreis (1827-1909); Diss. Greifswald 1970
 Genealogy database entry by Vera V. Mainz and Gregory S. Girolami 1998

1827 births
1909 deaths
19th-century German chemists
People from Eutin
People from Oldenburg (state)
University of Göttingen alumni
Academic staff of the University of Göttingen
Academic staff of the University of Greifswald
Members of the Göttingen Academy of Sciences and Humanities